Kiby is a village in Vadsø Municipality, Troms og Finnmark county, Norway. The fishing village had a population of 39 in 2003, although it had a population of 208 in 1891. Vardø Airport, which opened on 1 August 1974, is located at Kiby.

Norwegian-American poet Julius Berg Johannesen was born in Kiby in 1869. He immigrated to the US 1891, where he published three books with poems.

References

Villages in Finnmark
Vadsø